This is a list of universities in Singapore.

Local universities

Local Autonomous Universities
There are six autonomous universities (AUs) in Singapore.

Local Publicly-Funded Private University: University of the Arts Singapore
In March 2021, Minister for Education Lawrence Wong announced that Singapore’s first arts university will be established in an alliance between the Nanyang Academy of Fine Arts and LASALLE College of the Arts, in a system akin to the University of the Arts, London. The formation of the University of the Arts Singapore (UAS) will see both colleges under the umbrella university be given degree-awarding powers independent of their current foreign partners, where the current long-distance degrees are issued through foreign universities. Singaporeans and permanent residents (PRs) enrolled in the approved degree programmes at the university of the arts will pay subsidised fees, comparable to those at autonomous universities here.

The seventh local university of Singapore will be the only publicly-funded private university other than the now defunct and restructured UniSIM in Singapore, and also the only university of the arts with its own degree-conferring power in Singapore slated to open in 2024.

Constituent colleges:
 Nanyang Academy of Fine Arts
 LASALLE College of the Arts

Defunct universities
 Nanyang University (Merged with the University of Singapore to form the National University of Singapore in 1980.)
 SIM University (Restructured into the Singapore University of Social Sciences (SUSS) and brought under the ambit of the Ministry of Education in 2017.)

Private education institutions
Private education institutions (PEIs) are regulated by the Committee for Private Education (CPE).

Local campuses of foreign universities
The following private education institutions are local branches of foreign universities.
 École hôtelière de Lausanne (EHL)
 École Supérieure des Sciences Economiques et Commerciales (ESSEC)
 INSEAD
 S P Jain School of Global Management
 DigiPen Institute of Technology
 German Institute of Science and Technology - TUM Asia
 Sorbonne-Assas International Law School
 Curtin Singapore
 James Cook University Singapore

External degree programmes
The following private education institutions offer external degree programmes (EDPs) with undergraduate or graduate degrees conferred by the institutions' partner universities.

See also
 Lists of universities and colleges by country

References

 
Universities
Singapore
Singapore